Castleton Tea Estate  is a tea garden in the Kurseong CD block in the Kurseong subdivision of the Darjeeling district in the Indian state of West Bengal.

History
The garden was planted by Dr. Charles Graham in 1885. The Goodricke Group took over the garden in 1984.

The tea estate was earlier named Kumseri. There was a building named “Bank Ghar’’, which had the look of a castle and from that building, the place became Castleton.

Geography

The garden
The most renowned of all the gardens of the Goodricke Group is Castleton Tea Estate. The earth, sun, mist and dew bless the mountain slopes to grow the world’s best teas that are in demand around the world. 

The names of garden sections are loaded with nostalgic emotions about the place – Bhalu Khop is a bear cave, Jim Basha means an erstwhile manager’s domain, Dhobitar was a washerman’s clothesline and Baseri means a resting place.

Note: The map alongside presents some of the notable locations in the subdivision. All places marked in the map are linked in the larger full screen map.

Economy
Quality is the essence of Castleton Tea Estate. It has been awarded the ISO9000/HACCP/ISO 22000 Quality Systems Certification. The quality levels are so high that it has fetched world record prices.

The main products of Castleton Tea Estate are black tea, green tea, white tea, Muscatel, and Moonlight, which are picked from delicate Chinese bushes. The Darjeeling tea produced here has a rose like fragrance and the unique Muscatel flavour.

The Goodricke Group
The Goodricke Group owns five tea estates in Darjeeling: Thurbo, Badamtam, Barnesbeg, Castleton and Margaret's Hope.

References

External links
 

Tea estates in Darjeeling district